Khortha (also romanized as Kortha or Khotta) or alternatively classified as Eastern Magahi is a language which is considered dialect of Magahi language spoken in the Indian state of Jharkhand, mainly in 16 districts of two divisions: North Chotanagpur and Santhal Pargana. Khortha is spoken by the Sadaans as native language and used by the tribal as a link language. It is most spoken language of Jharkhand.

Geographical Distribution
Khortha is spoken in North Chota Nagpur division and Santal Pargana division of Jharkhand. The 13 districts are Hazaribagh, Koderma, Giridih, Bokaro, Dhanbad, Chatra, Ramgarh, Deoghar, Dumka, Sahebganj, Pakur, Godda, and Jamtara.

In Bihar, districts where Khortha is spoken include Jamui, Aurangabad, Gaya and Nawada.

Classification
George Grierson classified Khortha as a dialect of Magahi language in his linguist survey. But recent study demonstrate that Khortha is similar to other Bihari languages of Jharkhand called Sadani than Magahi language.

Literature
In 1950, Sriniwas Panuri translated Kali Das's Meghadutam in Khortha. In 1956, he composed two works Balkiran and Divyajyoti. Bhubaneswar Dutta Sharma, Sriniwas Panuri, Viswanath Dasaundhi and Viswanath Nagar were among first people who started literature in Khortha. Some prominent writers in Khortha language are A.K Jha, Shivnath Pramanik, B.N Ohdar.

Sample Phrases

See also
Khortha cinema
 2021–2022 Language Movement in Jharkhand

References 

Bihari languages
Languages of Jharkhand